Development corporations or development firms are organizations established by governments in several countries for the purpose of urban development. They often are responsible for the development of new suburban areas or the redevelopment of existing ones.

Australia
In Australia development corporations are often responsible for the economic promotion and growth of areas considered to be under-performing economically. Such corporations include:
Central Coast Development Corporation (1998–); previously known as the Festival Development Corporation
Cooks Cove Development Corporation; based in The Rocks
Hunter Development Corporation (2007–); based in Newcastle
Honeysuckle Development Corporation (1992–2007; merged with the Regional Land Management Corporation to form the Hunter Development Corporation); based in Newcastle
Macquarie Point Development Corporation (2012–); based in Hobart, Tasmania
Northern Tasmania Development Corporation (2017-); North Eastern Tasmania, including Launceston. 
South Sydney Development Corporation (1996–2005); responsible for managing the Green Square area

Denmark
Ørestad Development Corporation (1993–2007); responsible for urban redevelopment of Ørestad. It also constructed parts of the Copenhagen Metro.

India
City and Industrial Development Corporation (1970–); agency of the Government of Maharashtra. Constructed the planned town of Navi Mumbai. Currently conducting urban infrastructure and new town developments.
Housing and Urban Development Corporation (1970–); agency of the Ministry of Housing and Urban Poverty Alleviation. Responsible for building affordable housing and managing urban development.

Israel
Moriah Jerusalem Development Corporation (1986–); established by the Jerusalem Municipality.

South Africa
Coega Development Corporation
Eastern Cape Development Corporation
Free State Development Corporation

United Kingdom
In the United Kingdom, New Town Development Corporations are organisations established under the New Towns Act 1946 by the UK government, charged with the urban development of an area, outside the usual system of Town and Country Planning in the United Kingdom. Originally intended to manage the development of New Towns in the United Kingdom, they were also established for more substantial urban renewal programmes by the Town Development Act 1952.

Urban development corporations in England and Wales

New town development corporations

Mayoral development corporations
The Localism Act 2011 permitted the Mayor of London to create mayoral development corporations in Greater London. The Cities and Local Government Devolution Act 2016 later permitted the creation of mayoral development corporations in combined authority areas.

See also
 Economic development corporation in the United States
 Laganside Corporation, Urban Development Corporation for Belfast, Northern Ireland
 Community Futures in Canada
 Land development

References

Development corporations